Ten Tales is a studio album by American jazz saxophonist Joe Lovano and French jazz drummer Aldo Romano. The album was released on November 29, 1994 and consists of 10 original instrumental compositions recorded in Paris in 1989 plus jazz standard "Autumn in New York" composed by Vernon Duke.

Track listing

Personnel
Joe Lovano –  producer, saxophones
Aldo Romano – drums, photography, producer

Production
Bernard Amiard – art direction, design
Pascal Bodin – preparation for release
Philippe Carles – liner notes
Christof Déjan – engineer
Jean-Marie Guérin – engineer
Marc Le Hene – engineer
Francois LeMaire – executive producer
Christian Orsini – mastering
Patxi – adaptation
Jean-Jacques Pussiau – executive producer
Patrick Saunders – translation

References

External links
 

Sunnyside Records albums
Joe Lovano albums
1994 albums